Faces of Hope is an album by American jazz pianist Andrew Hill, recorded in 1980 and released on the Italian Soul Note label. The album features three of Hill's original compositions and one interpretation of a Lee Morgan tune.

Reception

The AllMusic review by Ron Wynn awarded the album 4 stars and stated "Sometimes loping, sometimes soaring solo piano from Andrew Hill, one of several impressive releases he made in the '80s. This time, however, it's neither the arrangements nor the songs that score, but Hill's emphatic execution of them".

Track listing
All compositions by Andrew Hill except as indicated
 "Rob It Mohe" - 14:55  
 "Ceora" (Lee Morgan) - 5:22  
 "Bayside 1" - 15:30  
 "Bayside 2" - 4:31  
 *Recorded at Barigozzi Studios, Milano, Italy on June 13 & 14, 1980

Personnel
 Andrew Hill - piano

References

Black Saint/Soul Note albums
Andrew Hill albums
1980 albums
Solo piano jazz albums